Achlidon agrestis is a species of crab in the family Pseudothelphusidae, and the only species in the genus Achlidon. It lives in rivers in Mexico and Costa Rica.

References

Pseudothelphusidae
Freshwater crustaceans of North America
Monotypic crustacean genera
Taxobox binomials not recognized by IUCN